The Ministry of Marine Affairs and Fisheries (KKP) is a government ministry that organises marine affairs and fisheries within the Indonesian government.

Task and function
The Ministry of Marine Affairs and Fisheries' primary task is to marine affairs and fisheries in Indonesia; its functions are as follows:
 To develop, establish, and execute marine affairs and fisheries policies
 Asset management within the Ministry of Marine Affairs and Fisheries
 Supervision of execution of marine affairs and fisheries activity
 Provider of technical support and supervision with regional level
 Executor of national level technical assistance

Organizational structure

 Office of the Deputy Minister
 Secretariat General
 Directorate General of Capture Fisheries
 Directorate General of Aquaculture
 Directorate General of Fisheries Management and Marketing
 Directorate General of Marine, Coastal Region and Small Islands
 Directorate General of Marine and Fisheries Resources Surveillance
 Inspectorate General
 Marine Affairs and Fisheries Research and Development Agency
 Human Resource Development Agency for Marine Affairs and Fisheries
 Fish Quarantine, Quality Control and Fisheries Security Agency
 Special Advisor to the Minister on Economics, Sosial and Culture
 Special Advisor to the Minister on Public Policy
 Special Advisor to the Minister on Community and Inter-agency Cooperation
 Special Advisor to the Minister on Ecology and Marine Resources

Minister of Marine Affairs and Fisheries

External links
 Ministry of Marine Affairs and Fisheries
 Ministry of Marine Affairs and Fisheries 

Government ministries of Indonesia
Fisheries ministries
Maritime affairs ministries
Transport organizations based in Indonesia